Dongguocun is a town of Qiaodong District in the southern outskirts of Xingtai, Hebei, People's Republic of China. The name appears to mean "East Guo Village Township", but in fact "Dongguo" (lit. "Eastern Wall") is a separate (and uncommon) Chinese surname. , it has 11 residential communities and 2 villages under its administration.

See also
List of township-level divisions of Hebei

References

Township-level divisions of Hebei